Santovenia de Pisuerga is a municipality located in the province of Valladolid, Castile and León, Spain. It has a population of 4,480 inhabitants.

See also
Cuisine of the province of Valladolid

References

Municipalities in the Province of Valladolid